The 2002 season was the New York Jets' 33rd in the National Football League (NFL), their 43rd season overall and their second under head coach Herman Edwards. The team tried to improve upon their 10–6 record from 2001 but failed to do so after a 2–5 start. However, the Jets recovered and finished 9–7, winning their second AFC East division title.

After a 24–21 week 8 loss to the Cleveland Browns at the Meadowlands dropped the Jets' season record to 2–5, head coach Herman Edwards gave his famous "You play to win the game" response to a question in his press conference the following Tuesday. Edwards' vigorous defense of his team's refusal to quit, along with the midseason debut of quarterback Chad Pennington, helped spark the Jets' turnaround.

After posting a stunning rout of the Indianapolis Colts by a score of 41–0 at the Meadowlands in the Wild Card round of the playoffs, they lost for the second year in a row to the eventual AFC champion Oakland Raiders, 30–10 in the Divisional round.

As of the 2022 season, this is the Jets' most recent AFC East division title.

Offseason

2002 Expansion Draft

2002 NFL Draft

Undrafted free agents

Staff

Roster

Preseason

Regular season

Schedule
Under the NFL's newly established schedule rotation, during the 2002 regular season the Jets played against all of the teams from the AFC West, as well as the Cleveland Browns from the AFC North and the Jacksonville Jaguars from the AFC South, who finished in the same positions as the Jets in their respective divisions in 2001. Their non-conference opponents were from the NFC North.

Note: Intra-division opponents are in bold text.

Game summaries

Week 1: at Buffalo Bills

Week 2: vs. New England Patriots

Week 3: at Miami Dolphins

Week 4: at Jacksonville Jaguars

Week 5: vs. Kansas City Chiefs

Week 7: vs. Minnesota Vikings

Week 8: vs. Cleveland Browns

Week 9: at San Diego Chargers

Week 10: vs. Miami Dolphins

Week 11: at Detroit Lions

Week 12: vs. Buffalo Bills

Week 13: at Oakland Raiders

Week 14: vs. Denver Broncos

Week 15: at Chicago Bears

Week 16: at New England Patriots

Week 17: vs. Green Bay Packers

Standings

Postseason

Schedule

Game summaries

AFC Wild Card Playoffs: vs. (5) Indianapolis Colts

This game turned out to be the Jets' last home playoff game at Giants Stadium, and as of 2022, it is also their last home playoff game to date.

AFC Divisional Playoffs: at (1) Oakland Raiders

External links
2002 team stats

AFC East championship seasons
New York Jets seasons
New York Jets
New York Jets season
21st century in East Rutherford, New Jersey
Meadowlands Sports Complex